William Roy Hammer is an American paleontologist who is credited with the discovery of the first carnivorous dinosaur unearthed in Antarctica, Cryolophosaurus, in 1991. He was professor of geology and curator of the Frxyell Geology Museum at Augustana College in Rock Island, IL from 1981 to 2017.

Biography 
Hammer was born in Detroit, Michigan and attended Wayne State University where he earned a bachelor's degree and masters in Zoology and completed a doctorate in Paleontology. As a student researcher, he was introduced to the study of fossil vertebrates in Antarctica by his advisor, Dr. John Cosgriff.

Contributions to paleontology 

Hammer was part of eight expeditions to Antarctica between 1977 and 2017. 
In 1991, Ohio State University geologist David Elliot was studying igneous rocks on Mt. Kirkpatrick near the Beardmore Glacier in Antarctica when he found some scree that contained bone. Hammer, who was working on synapsids fossils nearby, investigated the site and found the femur of a large theropod dinosaur exposed from the rock. The quarry later produced a skull with a unique head crest that was described in 1994 as belonging to a new genus and species, Cryolophosaurus ellioti.

Hammer also collected the partial remains of a sauropodmoropha dinosaur. When the specimen (a partial foot, leg and ankle bones) was later described and a new genus and species named, Glacialisaurus hammeri, it was to honor Dr. Hammer for his contributions to vertebrate paleontology and Antarctic research.

References 

Hammer, W.R., and Hickerson, W.J., 1994. A crested theropod dinosaur from Antarctica. Science 264:828-830.

Year of birth missing (living people)
Living people
Augustana College (Illinois) faculty
Scientists from Detroit
American paleontologists
20th-century American geologists
21st-century American geologists